Saad Abdul-Salaam (born September 8, 1991) is an American professional soccer player who plays as a defender for San Antonio FC in the USL Championship.

Career

Early career
Born in Charlotte, North Carolina, Abdul-Salaam grew up in Gahanna, Ohio where he played for the local high school side that won the state championship in 2009. Abdul-Salaam then went on to attend the University of Akron where he played for the Akron Zips.

Sporting Kansas City
After his four-years at Akron, Abdul-Salaam was drafted as the twelfth overall pick during the 2015 MLS SuperDraft by Sporting Kansas City. On May 19, 2015, Abdul-Salaam was recalled from his loan with the San Antonio Scorpions by Sporting Kansas City.

San Antonio Scorpions (loan)
On April 1, 2015, it was announced that Abdul-Salaam would be loaned out to the San Antonio Scorpions for the North American Soccer League spring season. He made his professional debut for the team on April 4 against the Tampa Bay Rowdies. He started the match and played the full 90 as San Antonio fell 3–1.

Returning to Kansas City
He was called back on May 20, 2015. He was subbed on for Krisztian Nemeth in the 90th minute making his first MLS appearance. He finished the 2015 season starting 10 games and played 22 games and had 1 assist. In the playoffs he made the most iconic moment. In the penalty shoot out against the Portland Timbers, he had the chance to win it all but he instead hit both goal posts and the ball went out. In 2016, his sophomore season, he played in 30 games, scoring none but having 6 assists which was more assists than any other SKC player that season. In 2017 he scored his first professional goal in the team's 3–0 win against Minnesota United on June 21.

New York City
On December 14, 2017, it was announced that Abdul-Salaam was traded to New York City FC in exchange for Khiry Shelton. He was loaned to Phoenix Rising FC on August 13, 2018.

Seattle Sounders FC
On February 26, 2019, Abdul-Salaam's rights were traded to Seattle Sounders FC in exchange for $50,000 of Targeted Allocation Money. He was released by Seattle at the end of the 2019 season.

FC Cincinnati
On December 3, 2019, Abdul-Salaam was selected by FC Cincinnati in Stage Two of the 2019 MLS Re-Entry Process.

Columbus Crew
On April 17, 2021, Abdul-Salaam was selected off waivers by Columbus Crew, who had been waived a few days earlier by Cincinnati following their acquisition of Edgar Castillo. Following the 2021 season, Columbus opted to decline their contract option on Abdul-Salaam.

San Antonio FC 
On June 22 2022, San Antonio FC announced that they signed Abdul-Salaam for the remainder of the 2022 season.

Career statistics

Honors

Seattle Sounders FC
 MLS Cup: 2019

Columbus Crew
 Campeones Cup: 2021

San Antonio FC 
 USL Championship (regular season): 2022
 USL Championship Final: 2022

References

External links 
 

1991 births
Living people
African-American soccer players
Akron Zips men's soccer players
Portland Timbers U23s players
Sporting Kansas City players
San Antonio Scorpions players
New York City FC players
Phoenix Rising FC players
Seattle Sounders FC players
Tacoma Defiance players
FC Cincinnati players
Columbus Crew players
San Antonio FC players
Association football defenders
Sporting Kansas City draft picks
USL League Two players
Major League Soccer players
North American Soccer League players
American men's soccer players
Soccer players from Ohio
USL Championship players
21st-century African-American sportspeople